Kwomtari is the eponymous language of the Kwomtari family of Papua New Guinea.

Spencer (2008) is a short grammar of Kwomtari. The language has an SOV constituent order and nominative–accusative alignment. Both subjects and objects are marked suffixally on the verb. Verbs are inflected for status (mood) rather than for tense or aspect.

Locations
Ethnologue lists Kwomtari as spoken in six villages in Komtari (Kwomtari) ward, Amanab Rural LLG, Sandaun Province.

Baron (2007) lists Kwomtari-speaking villages as Mango, Kwomtari, Baiberi, Yenabi, Yau'uri, and Wagroni.

Phonology

The phoneme  is realized as a voiced bilabial fricative  intervocalically and voiceless bilabial fricative  elsewhere. The realization of the phoneme  is in free variation between a voiced retroflex lateral  and a voiced retroflex stop .

They have also been attested in Weri, a Goilalan language of south-east Papua, and certain Dani dialects.

References

External links
Kwomtari phonology, word examples and text example

Languages of Sandaun Province
Kwomtari–Nai languages